Hughesville Township is an inactive township in Pettis County, in the U.S. state of Missouri.

Hughesville Township was erected in 1878, taking its name from the community of Hughesville, Missouri.

References

Townships in Missouri
Townships in Pettis County, Missouri